Agus Dermawan Wintarto Martowardojo (born 24 January 1956) is a former Governor of the Indonesian Central Bank. He held the office for a five-year term from 24 May 2013 to 24 May 2018. Previously, he was Finance Minister of Indonesia between 2010 and 2013 after succeeding former minister Sri Mulyani Indrawati, who resigned from the office and took position as Managing Director of the World Bank Group.

Early career 
Agus was born in Amsterdam, Netherlands. After graduating from University of Indonesia's School of Economics in 1984, he became an international loan officer at the Indonesian branch of Bank of America. Agus has a long career as one of top bankers in Indonesia. He was the Chief Executive Officer of Bank Mandiri, the largest bank in Indonesia, between 2005 and 2010. He was the President Director of Bank Bumiputera (1995–1998) and President Director of Bank Ekspor Impor Indonesia (1998–1999).

His performance as head of Bank Mandiri was considered successful, as he slashed non-performing loans and raised the bank's profile among international investors. He also increased profits in the banks. In 2008 for example, the bank paid $418m in dividends to the shareholders.  He was also instrumental in helping the Finance Ministry in recovering Rp 1.23 trillion (US$133.15 million) of state money from Tommy Soeharto, son of late former president Soeharto.

Finance Ministry 

Following the resignation of Sri Mulyani Indrawati, Agus was appointed as Finance Minister in the Second United Indonesia Cabinet. His selection was greeted positively by analysts as he was considered to have managerial skills required for the position. He also has wide international experience and has represented Indonesia in G20 forums.

In March 2011 he announced his first fiscal policy as Finance Minister with a focus on promoting real sector growth and investment intended to spur Indonesia’s economic growth. Highlights of the new regulations included removing the value added tax (VAT) for the sale of houses worth less than Rp 70 million (US$7,910) compared with the previous Rp 55 million; eliminating taxes on the sales of cooking oil and bulk cooking oil for the poor; and providing in advance 50 percent of the funds needed by the State Logistics Agency (Bulog) for the rice for the poor program.

Governor of Bank Indonesia

In 2008, following resignation of Boediono as Governor of Bank Indonesia to run as Vice President of Indonesia as the running mate of Susilo Bambang Yudhoyono, Agus was nominated as one of candidates for Governor. However his nomination was rejected by the national Legislature, apparently for political reasons.
On 22 February 2013, President Susilo Bambang Yudhoyono surprisingly named Agus as his sole candidate for the governorship, replacing Darmin Nasution. On 27 March 2013, the Indonesian House of Representatives' Finance Commission confirmed Agus as governor of Bank Indonesia for the period of 2013–2018. Agus won 46 votes of support and seven votes against. One member abstained from the vote.

References

1956 births
Living people
Finance Ministers of Indonesia
Governors of Bank Indonesia
Indonesian bankers
Indonesian economists
Businesspeople from Amsterdam